Yrjö Eliel Kolho (née Saxberg, 23 April 1888 – 13 February 1969) was a Finnish sport shooter who competed in the 1920 Summer Olympics. He was born in Keuruu and died in Vilppula. He changed his name in 1905.

In 1920 he won the silver medal as member of the Finnish team in the team running deer, single shots event and the bronze medal in the team running deer, double shots competition. In the 1920 Summer Olympics he also participated in the following events:

 100 metre running deer, single shots - fourth place
 Team 50 metre free pistol - eleventh place

References

External links
profile

1888 births
1969 deaths
People from Keuruu
Finnish male sport shooters
Running target shooters
ISSF pistol shooters
Olympic shooters of Finland
Shooters at the 1920 Summer Olympics
Olympic silver medalists for Finland
Olympic bronze medalists for Finland
Olympic medalists in shooting
Medalists at the 1920 Summer Olympics
Sportspeople from Central Finland